Portstewart Football Club is an intermediate, Northern Irish football club from Portstewart, County Londonderry. The club was founded in 1968 and currently plays in the NIFL Premier Intermediate League. The club's main colours are sky blue and navy. Portstewart are nicknamed "The Seahawks". Portstewart Reserves play in the Coleraine and District Morning League. In 2019, Portstewart introduced an Under 20s team, to play in the Championship/PIL Development League.

History

Although there are records of teams playing under the name of Portstewart as far back as 1926, Portstewart Football Club was founded in 1968, to play in the Castlerock and Coleraine District League afternoon section. Led by Tony McKeague, Portstewart won the league and the Doherty Cup in their debut season. The next season the club progressed into the North West League Division 2 and earned promotion to the North West Division 1.

Portstewart took another stride forward in 1979, when they applied to join the Northern Ireland Intermediate League (NIIL). The most defining moment in the club's history came when they appointed Frankie Moffatt, for the first of two spells, as manager in 1984. Moffatt delivered the league title in his first year in charge and followed this up with success in the NIIL Challenge Cup and NIIL League Cup. Following spells at Ballymoney United and then Coleraine, Moffatt returned as manager in 1991.

Portstewart created history in 1994, when they defeated Limavady Utd 1–0 in the William Youngers Intermediate Cup final, becoming the first junior team in over 100 years of the competition to lift the trophy. In 2003, Portstewart were accepted into newly created Irish league Division 2.

Moffatt's decision to step down as manager resulted in his assistant Trevor McKendry taking charge of team affairs, and under his leadership Portstewart continued to grow. McKendry led the team to the North West Cup final in 2004 when they were narrowly defeated by Tobermore United. In the 2005/06 season, when Portstewart gained promotion to second tier of Irish League football for the first time in the club's history. Portstewart won the 2007/08 Craig Memorial Cup beating Tobermore United, 2–1.

In 2016, the club was relegated from the Northern Ireland Football League, but was promoted back after only one season. The 2016/17 season saw Portstewart win the Northern Ireland Intermediate League, Intermediate Challenge Cup and Intermediate League Cup. The club also reached the fifth round of the Irish Cup where they got defeated by Glenavon.

The 2017/18 season, saw Portstewart get to the final of Craig Memorial Cup, losing 2–1 to Maiden City. On 17 July 2018, the club announced the resignation of long-serving manager and former captain, Gary Taylor. 3 days later, Johnny Law was appointed as the new manager.

During the 2018/19 season, a match between Portstewart and Sport & Leisure Swifts was abandoned after 70 minutes when a fan joined a "mass brawl" between players and coaches. Further controversy followed when Portstewart lost their place in the Irish Intermediate Cup final, following a protest from Queen's University about the eligibility of one of Portstewart's players.

Portstewart beat Moyola Park 1–0, to win the 2019 Craig Memorial Cup. The 2019/20 season was disrupted in March by the COVID-19 pandemic, with the club still unbeaten in the league and sitting 2nd after 14 games.

Stadium

The club's home ground, Mullaghacall, was officially opened in 1997 by Harry Gregg MBE. A revamp in the Irish league saw a number of clubs demoted in 2008 into an interim league until ground improvements were completed. A new stand was built at Mullaghacall in 2009 and the club once again entered into the reformed Irish league.

Mullaghacall is a regular host of the SuperCupNI.

Current squad

Honours

Intermediate honours
Irish Intermediate Cup: 1
1993–94
IFA Intermediate Second Division: 1
2005–06
Craig Memorial Cup: 4
1985–86, 2007–08, 2019–20, 2021-22
Northern Ireland Intermediate League: 2
1984–85, 2016–17
Intermediate Challenge Cup: 1
2016–17
Intermediate League Cup: 1
2016–17

External links
 nifootball.co.uk (fixtures, results and tables of all leagues)

References

 

Association football clubs established in 1968
Association football clubs in Northern Ireland
Association football clubs in County Londonderry
1968 establishments in Northern Ireland
NIFL Premier Intermediate League clubs
FC